Kenneth Nlata Sema (born 30 September 1993) is a Swedish professional footballer who plays as a midfielder for EFL Championship club Watford and the Sweden national team.

Club career

Early career
Sema got promoted to the IFK Norrköping first team as a 19-year old in 2013. However, he spent the entire season on loan to IF Sylvia and did not get his contract renewed after it expired at the end of the season. 
In 2014, he signed for second-tier team Ljungskile SK.

Östersunds FK
In January 2016, Sema signed for Östersunds FK in the Allsvenskan, where he would have his major breakthrough. Sema won the 2016–17 Svenska Cupen with Östersund, assisting three of their four goals in the final, and later played a major role in their 2017–18 UEFA Europa League campaign. On 22 February 2018, Sema scored a goal in a 2–1 win against Arsenal in the round of 32. Despite this, Östersund were eliminated from the Europa League after losing 2–4 on aggregate.

Watford
On 4 July 2018, Östersunds FK chairman Daniel Kindberg revealed that Sema was close to signing for Premier League club Watford on a five-year contract. The next day, Watford confirmed the signing.

Loan to Udinese
On 22 August 2019, Udinese Calcio signed Sema on a season-long loan from Watford. He made his Serie A debut for Udinese on 25 August 2019 in a 1–0 win against A.C. Milan.

International career
In 2016, Sema was a part of the Sweden Olympic team that played in Brazil, and scored his first U23 goal in a match against South Korea Olympic. In January 2017, he debuted for the Sweden senior team in a friendly 6–0 win over Slovakia.

Sema was an unused substitute in the two-legged playoff against Italy in November 2017, which Sweden won, and therefore qualified for the 2018 FIFA World Cup. Despite featuring in commercials with the rest of the Sweden squad before the World Cup, Sema was eventually left out of the World Cup squad.

Sema made his competitive international debut in a UEFA Euro 2020 qualifying game against the Faroe Islands national football team which Sweden won 3–0.

Personal life
Sema was born in Sweden to Congolese parents, and his brother Maic Sema is also a footballer. He speaks with a stammer, and after a video went viral of him doing a post match interview with Watford TV, he was praised as a role model for children and adults with speech impediments.

Career statistics

Club

International

Honours
Östersund
Svenska Cupen: 2016–17

References

1993 births
Living people
Sportspeople from Norrköping
Swedish footballers
Sweden international footballers
Sweden youth international footballers
Swedish people of Democratic Republic of the Congo descent
Swedish sportspeople of African descent
Association football midfielders
Ljungskile SK players
Östersunds FK players
Watford F.C. players
Udinese Calcio players
Allsvenskan players
Superettan players
Premier League players
Serie A players
Olympic footballers of Sweden
Footballers at the 2016 Summer Olympics
UEFA Euro 2020 players
Swedish expatriate footballers
Expatriate footballers in Italy
English Football League players
Footballers from Östergötland County